Adam Ndlovu (26 June 1970 – 16 December 2012) was a footballer, who played as a striker.

During his club career, he played for Highlanders, SC Kriens, SR Delémont, FC Zürich, Moroka Swallows, Dynamos and Free State Stars, and was also a member of the Zimbabwe national team.

His brother, Peter Ndlovu, is also a former professional footballer. 

Ndlovu died after a tyre burst on the car in which he was travelling near Victoria Falls Airport, causing the car to leave the road and hit a tree. His brother Peter was critically injured.

References

External links
 
 

1970 births
2012 deaths
Zimbabwean footballers
Zimbabwean expatriate footballers
Zimbabwe international footballers
Association football forwards
FC Zürich players
SC Kriens players
SR Delémont players
Moroka Swallows F.C. players
Dynamos F.C. (South Africa) players
Free State Stars F.C. players
Swiss Super League players
2004 African Cup of Nations players
Expatriate footballers in Switzerland
Expatriate soccer players in South Africa
Alumni of Mzilikazi High School
Road incident deaths in Zimbabwe
Highlanders F.C. players